Autolycus is a lunar impact crater that is located in the southeast part of Mare Imbrium. The crater is named after the ancient Greek astronomer Autolycus of Pitane. West of the formation is Archimedes, a formation more than double the size of Autolycus. Just to the north is Aristillus, and the outer ramparts of these two craters overlap in the intermediate stretch of the lunar mare.

Description
The rim of Autolycus is somewhat irregular, although generally circular overall. It has a small outer rampart and an irregular interior with no central peak. It possesses a light ray system that extends for a distance of over 400 kilometers. Due to its rays, Autolycus is mapped as part of the Copernican System.  Some of the ray material appears to overlay the flooded floor of Archimedes, and thus Autolycus is older than Archimedes.  Aristillus (to the north), however, has rays that overlay both Autolycus and Archimedes, and thus it is the youngest of the three craters.

The first man-made impact upon the Moon was when the Luna 2 probe crash-landed just to the west-southwest of the crater rim on September 13, 1959, according to the claim of one Hungarian astronomer who claimed to see an explosion of dust.

Satellite craters

By convention these features are identified on lunar maps by placing the letter on the side of the crater midpoint that is closest to Autolycus.

Notes

References

External links
 

Impact craters on the Moon
Mare Imbrium